Goniatitina is one of two suborders included in the order Goniatitida; extinct Paleozoic ammonoid cephalopods only distantly related to the Nautiloidea.

Taxonomy
The Goniatitina contains 17 defined superfamilies, listed below. 
 Adrianitoidea
 Cycloloboidea
 Dimorphoceratoidea
 Gastrioceratoidea
 Goniatitoidea
 Gonioloboceratoidea
 Marathonitoidea
 Neodimorphoceratoidea
 Neoglyphioceratoidea
 Neoicoceratoidea
 Nomismoceratoidea
 Pericycloidea
 Popanoceratoidea
 Schistoceratoidea
 Shumarditoidea
 Somoholitoidea
 Thalassoceratoidea

References
 Miller, Furnish, and Schindewolf, 1957, Paleozoic Ammonoidea, Treatise on Invertebrate Paleontology, Part L. Geological Society of America and University of Kansas Press.
 Saunders, Work, and Nikoleva 1999. Evolution of Complexity in Paleozoic Ammonoid Sutures, Supplementary material. Science 22 October 1999: Vol. 286 no. 5440 pp. 760–763. Abstract  
 Goniatitina in GONIAT online 
 suborder Goniatitina Hyatt 1884, Paleodb query, 4/18/14.

 
Goniatitida